The 1953 Central Michigan Chippewas football team represented Central Michigan College of Education, renamed Central Michigan University in 1959, in the Interstate Intercollegiate Athletic Conference (IIAC) during the 1953 college football season. In their third season under head coach Kenneth Kelly, the Chippewas compiled a 7–1–1 record (5–0–1 against IIAC opponents), won the IIAC championship, and outscored all opponents by a combined total of 244 to 129.

The team's statistical leaders included Lornie Kerr with 327 passing yards, Chuck Miller with 938 rushing yards, and Jim Podoley with 186 receiving yards. Miller received the team's most valuable player award and also received the IIAC most valuable player award. Four Central Michigan players (Miller, tackle Ken Barron, guard Jack Clary, and center Dick Kackmeister) received first-team honors on the All-IIAC team.

Schedule

References

Central Michigan
Central Michigan Chippewas football seasons
Interstate Intercollegiate Athletic Conference football champion seasons
Central Michigan Chippewas football